Mshewa is an administrative ward in Same District of Kilimanjaro Region in Tanzania. According to the 2012 census, the ward has a total population of 6,154.

References

Wards of Same District
Wards of Kilimanjaro Region